The Limited Liability Partnership Act, 2008 was enacted by the Parliament of India to introduce and legally sanction the concept of LLP in India. Unlike the general partnerships in India, LLP is a body corporate and legal entity separate from its partners, have Perpetual succession and any change in the partners of an LLP shall not affect the existence, rights or liabilities of the LLP.

Section 4. Non-applicability of the Indian Partnership Act, 1932.—Save as otherwise provided, the provisions of the Indian Partnership Act, 1932 (9 of 1932) shall not apply to a limited liability partnership.

Overview 
LLP is a corporate business vehicle that enables professional expertise and entrepreneurial initiative to combine and operate in flexible, innovative and efficient manner, as a hybrid of companies & partnerships providing benefits of limited liability while allowing its members the flexibility for organizing their internal structure as a partnership. LLP is a legal entity partnership act.
 Separate Legal Entity- Continue its existence irrespective of changes in partners,
 LLP itself can enter into contracts and hold properties,
 Partners' Liability limited to the agreed contribution,
 Professional & Non-professional (Businessmen), both can set up LLP.

Definitions 
Foreign Limited Liability Partnership: An LLP formed, incorporated or registered outside India which establishes a place of business within India.
A LLP is a new form of business entity with limited liability. It is hybrid of companies and partnership.

Partner: Partner means any person who becomes a partner in the LLP in accordance with the LLP agreement.

Financial Year:  The period from the 1st day of April of a year to the 31st day of March of the following year. In the case of an LLP incorporated after the 30th day of September of a year, the financial year may end on the 31st day of March of the next following year.

Salient features

LLP agreement 
Any written agreement between the partners of the LLP or between the LLP and its partners which determines the mutual rights and duties of the partners and their rights and duties in relation to that LLP. It is not necessary to enter into an LLP agreement as per LLP Act, 2008. In the absence of LLP agreement, the mutual rights of corporates, at least two individuals who are partners of such limited liability partnership or nominees of such bodies corporate shall act as designated partners.

Accounts and audit 
LLP is required to maintain books of accounts for each year on cash basis or on accrual basis. Accounts shall be audited by Auditors appointed by the LLP. Audit of accounts is compulsory if turnover exceeds Rs. 40 lakhs in any financial year or contribution by partners exceed Rs. 25 lakhs.

The Statement of Accounts and Solvency for the year ended 31 March is required to be filed with the Registrar before 30 October in each year.

Penalty 
Any person guilty of an offence under this Act for which no punishment is expressly provided shall be liable to a fine which may extend to five lakh rupees but which shall not be less than five thousand rupees and which may extend to fifty thousand rupees for every day after the first day after which the default continues.

Taxation of a Limited Liability Partnership
LLP registered in India will be a resident even if only a part of control and management is in India. Profits distributed by LLP exempt in the hands of the partners. As per the Finance Bill, 2009, the income of an LLP is taxed only the hands of LLP and not the Partners. The entire taxation of LLPs is similar to the existing taxation pattern applicable to Partnerships registered and formed under The Indian Partnership Act, 1932. Dividend distribution tax is not applicable in case of LLPs, whereas it is 15.00%(plus surcharge @ 5% plus education cess @ 2% plus SHEC @ 1% of amount so declared, distributed or paid) in case of companies.

Annual compliance 
LLP has to complete the following compliance each year:

 Form 11- Annual Return of LLP (Filed pursuant to Rules 25(1) of the LLP Rules, 2009  (It usually contains the details of partners at the year end, details of changes in partnership firm during the year like admission of new partners, retirement and death of partner etc.) It specifically asks if the Capital committed by each partner has been received by the LLP.
 Form 8 - Statement of Account and Solvency (Filed pursuant to Rule 24 of the LLP Rules 2009  (It contains financial figures (Balance Sheet and Profit and Loss account), statement that the LLP is solvent. Attachments include Dues to MSME disclosures and Audit Report if the turnover of LLP Crosses Rs. 4 million for the financial year.
 DIR 3 KYC  - This is technically a requirement under the Companies Act but since the 'Designated partners Identification Number' (DPIN) has been merged with Director Identification Number (DIN), hence the annual requirement of DIR KYC is not applicable even to designated partners of LLP.

Tax compliances are not listed here.

 Earlier both Form 8 and Form 11 were pdf based forms where the forms were filled offline and uploaded after being digitally signed. However with the introduction of MCA -V3 in Feb 2022, all forms have been converted to web based forms. 
 Form 8 has to be filed within 30 days of passage of 6 months of closure of the financial year. Due date is usually 30 October.  
 Form 11 has to be filed within 60 days of closure of the financial year. Due date is usually 30 May.
 Both Form 8 and Form 11 are processed under STP mode i.e. Straight Processing mode. They are approved automatically and are not manually processed.
 Late fees for LLPs can go upto 25 times the normal fees for 'Small LLPs' and 50 times for 'Other than Small LLPs'.

References

External links 
 Limited Liability Partnership Act, 2008
 Ministry of Corporate Affairs

Indian business law
Acts of the Parliament of India 2008
Partnerships
Manmohan Singh administration